The Islamic Foundation is an institution based in Markfield, Leicestershire, established by Khurshid Ahmad and Khurram Murad.
It specialises in the fields of research, education and publication. It was established in 1973.

References

External links
Official site

Islamic organisations based in the United Kingdom
Islamic organizations established in 1973
1973 establishments in the United Kingdom
Organisations based in Leicestershire